Ptorthocera calva is a species of beetles in the family Callirhipidae, and the only species in the genus Ptorthocera. It was described by Champion in 1896, and is known from Guatemala.

References

Callirhipidae
Beetles described in 1896